Mae Carroll Fry was an American politician and schoolteacher. She was married to John Henry Fry in 1908. She was a Republican in Denver and served in the Colorado House of Representatives from 1927–1928. She was nominated to run again for the next session but failed to get elected with 3.4% of the vote.

She was born in Colorado where she lived for most of her life. After graduating from the University of Colorado with a bachelor's degree, Fry taught for eight years. She died after a lingering illness on December 4, 1940 in Pasadena, California.

References

Republican Party members of the Colorado House of Representatives
Year of birth missing
1940 deaths
20th-century American politicians
People from Pasadena, California
Women state legislators in Colorado
20th-century American women politicians
20th-century American women educators
20th-century American educators
Schoolteachers from Colorado
Politicians from Denver
University of Colorado alumni